Bless This Mess may refer to:

 Bless This Mess (By Divine Right album), 1999
 Bless This Mess (Lisa Mitchell album), 2012
 Bless This Mess (Bamboo Mañalac album), 2015
 Prima Donna (American band)#Bless this Mess, 2012 album
 Bless This Mess (TV series), American single-camera-sitcom, 2019